The serfdom in Tibet controversy is a prolonged public disagreement over the extent and nature of serfdom in Tibet prior to the annexation of Tibet into the People's Republic of China (PRC) in 1951. The debate is political in nature, with some arguing that the ultimate goal on the Chinese side is to legitimize Chinese control of the territory now known as the  Tibet Autonomous Region or Xizang Autonomous Region, and others arguing that the ultimate goal on the Western side is to weaken or undermine the Chinese state. The argument is that Tibetan culture, government, and society were barbaric prior to the PRC takeover of Tibet and that this only changed due to PRC policy in the region. The pro-Tibetan independence movement argument is that this is a misrepresentation of history created as a political tool in order to justify the Sinicization of Tibet.

Chinese government claims commonly portray Tibet from 1912 to 1951 as a feudal society and both the 13th and 14th Dalai Lamas as slave owners. These claims further highlight statements by the PRC that, prior to 1959, 95% of Tibetans lived in feudal serfdom, and cite cases of abuse and cruelty which are allegedly inherent to the traditional Tibetan system. Pro-Tibetan independence forces and countries which are sympathetic to their cause, especially many Western countries, often scrutinize the Chinese claims.

The idea of Tibet and the concept of serfdom 

One of the central points of contention in the debate about labour and human rights in the historical region of Tibet before and after its incorporation into the modern state of the People's Republic of China is the very definition of Tibet and serfdom itself, with some scholars claiming that the debate is framed around Eurocentric, Sinocentric and anachronistic ideas about statehood and society which are projected onto the history of the area in a way that distorts understanding. Some western scholars reject claims of "serfdom in Tibet" outright based on the view that "Tibet" cannot be defined as one political entity or social system; its political and socioeconomic structures have varied greatly over time and between sub-districts. The various polities comprising Tibet have changed significantly over the past 2,000 years, and even during the modern period there have been dramatic changes in what Tibet is, as anthropologist Geoff Childs writes: "[Tibet] has undergone numerous political transformations from a unified empire (640–842) incorporating parts of what are now Nepal, India, Pakistan, and several provinces of China (Gansu, Xinjiang, Sichuan, Yunnan), to a collection of independent and sometimes antagonistic kingdoms and polities associated with various monasteries (842–1248), to protectorate under the power of an expanding Mongol empire (1248–1368), back to a collection of independent and sometimes antagonistic kingdoms and polities associated with various monasteries (1368–1642), to a centralized state under the clerical administration of the Dalai Lamas (1642–1720), to a protectorate of the Manchu Qing Dynasty (1720–1911), and finally to a nation having de facto independence under the clerical administration of the Dalai Lamas (1911–1951)"Although the central leadership in Lhasa had authority of these areas for various periods, some Western writers claim that this did not imply the kind of political control seen in modern Western states. According to Luciano Petech, "K'ams [the Kham region, largely synonymous with the province of Xikang which was abolished in 1950] was practically independent of Lhasa under its great lamas" in the 18th century CE. Furthermore, the areas of Qinghai with large Tibetan populations were not continuously ruled by Lhasa, including in the period leading up to the establishment of the PRC (in the late 1930s and 1940s) when the Kuomintang Muslim warlord Ma Bufang ruled Qinghai within the Republic of China (ROC).

The definition of Tibet has been contested with a map of competing claims identifying six distinct types of Tibetan regions claimed by various entities. In the Qing Dynasty (1644-1912) and in the ROC (1912–1949), the part of Tibet governed by Lhasa was limited to the modern Tibet Autonomous Region, and did not include the Kham (Xikang) Province of China. Meanwhile, the western part of Xikang (i.e. Qamdo) and Qinghai was only occupied by Lhasa in the Tibet-Kham War which lasted from the 1910s to 1930s.

Generally, the government of the PRC also limits Tibet to the area it has designated the Tibet Autonomous Region, consisting of the traditional areas of Ü, Tsang, Ngari, along with Qamdo (i.e. the western Kham/Xikang) which was legally incorporated into the TAR when Xikang Province was abolished by the NPC in 1955. The Tibetan government in exile claims that other ethnically Tibetan areas to the east and to the north also belong to Tibet, i.e. "Greater Tibet". These areas now respectively belong to Qinghai Province, Gansu Province, Sichuan Province and Yunnan Province of China. Scholarship frequently represents a limited survey, restricted to the central region of Tibet, and may not accurately represent the whole of cultural Tibet or all Tibetan speaking peoples.

Discussing the social structure of Tibet inevitably leads to difficulties with defining terms. Not only may serf and feudalism be Western terms inappropriate for Asian use but the geography and peoples of Tibet vary according to interpreter. The lack of agreement of the various sides as to terminology highlights that the "serfdom in Tibet" controversy is a politicised debate, with the term "feudal serfdom" largely being used by the People's Republic of China as a justification for their taking control of Tibet. According to the PRC:...there was a historically imperative need for the progress of Tibetan society and the welfare of the Tibetan people to expel the imperialists and shake off the yoke of feudal serfdom. The founding of the People's Republic of China in 1949 brought hope for the deeply distressed Tibetan people. In conforming to the law of historical development and the interests of the Tibetan people, the Central People's Government worked actively to bring about Tibet's peaceful liberation. After that, important policies and measures were adopted for Tibet's Democratic Reform, regional autonomy, large-scale modernization and reform and opening-up.
However, the Tibetan Government-in-Exile responds: ...the Chinese justifications make no sense. First of all, international law does not accept justifications of this type. No country is allowed to invade, occupy, annex and colonize another country just because its social structure does not please it. Secondly, the PRC is responsible for bringing more suffering in the name of liberation. Thirdly, necessary reforms were initiated and Tibetans are quite capable of doing so.

Competing versions of Tibetan history
It is difficult to find academic consensus on the nature of society in Tibetan history. Sources on the history of Tibet are available from both pro-Chinese and pro-Tibetan writers.

Pro-Chinese materials may be published by mainstream Western publishers, or within the People's Republic of China. Tibetan materials, similarly, may be published by mainstream Western publishers, or by the Tibetan Government in Exile. Both sides hope to persuade foreign readers to support their own point of view through these publications.

Many of the pro-Chinese works in English on the subject were translated from Chinese. Asian studies scholar John Powers concludes that ideology was the most powerful influence on the translations: "In contemporary China, the Communist Party strictly controls the presentation of history, and several formal resolutions have been issued by the Central Committee, which are intended to guide historians in the "correct" interpretation of historical events and actors."

Western authors' writings on Tibetan history are sometimes controversial. For example, whilst Hugh Richardson, who lived in Lhasa in the 1930s and 1940s, before the takeover by the PRC in 1951, writes in Tibet and Its History that Chinese versions of Tibetan history are contemptible and he considers the Chinese rule brutal and illegal, Israel Epstein, a naturalized Chinese citizen born in Poland who similarly claims the authority of first-hand knowledge, this knowledge was gained post PRC annexation following the Chinese takeover of Tibet and must be viewed as Pro-PRC, supported Chinese rule. There are few academic assessments of the recent history of Tibet. Anthropologist and historian Melvyn Goldstein, who is fluent in Tibetan and has done considerable fieldwork with Tibetans in exile and in Tibet, considers pre-1950 Tibet to have been a feudal theocracy impaired by corrupt and incompetent leaders. It was de facto independent of China from 1911 to 1949, but not recognized as de jure independent of China by any nation, even its protective power Great Britain.

The Chinese side seeks to persuade international perception as to the appropriate nature and justifiability of Chinese rule in Tibet. Their position is that Tibet truly and historically belongs to China, that affairs of Tibet are internal matters, and Tibetans seek to internationalize their cause, in part by convincing readers that Tibet was independent. Concentrating as it does on questions of national sovereignty, the official position of the Tibetan Government in Exile is more moderate in tone than that of some of its more extreme supporters who conflate the rule of the lamas with Tibetan Buddhist ideals, seeking to promote a Buddhist dogma that competes with the Marxist dogma of "feudal serfdom" by portraying Tibet under the lamas as, in Robert Thurman's words: "a mandala of the peaceful, perfected universe".

Tibetologist Robert Barnett writes:

"Chinese references to preliberation conditions in Tibet thus appear to be aimed at creating popular support for Beijing's project in Tibet. These claims have particular resonance among people who share the assumption—based on nineteenth-century Western theories of "social evolution" that are still widely accepted in China—that certain forms of society are "backward" and should be helped to evolve by more "advanced" societies. This form of prejudice converges with some earlier Chinese views and with vulgar Marxist theories that imagine a vanguard movement liberating the oppressed classes or nationalities in a society, whether or not those classes agree that they are oppressed. Moreover, the Chinese have to present that oppression as very extensive, and that society as very primitive, in order to explain why there were no calls by the Tibetan peasantry for Chinese intervention on their behalf.

The question of Tibet's social history is therefore highly politicized, and Chinese claims in this respect are intrinsic to the functioning of the PRC, and not some free act of intellectual exploration. They have accordingly to be treated with caution. From a human rights point of view, the question of whether Tibet was feudal in the past is irrelevant. A more immediate question is why the PRC does not allow open discussion of whether Tibet was feudal or oppressive. Writers and researchers in Tibet face serious repercussions if they do not concur with official positions on issues such as social conditions in Tibet prior to its "liberation," and in such a restrictive climate, the regime's claims on this issue have little credibility."

The political debate
Chinese sources portray Tibet before 1950 as feudal serfdom in which serfs suffered terribly under the despotic rule of lamas and aristocrats. Some Tibetan sources describe the people as happy, content, and devoted to Buddhism. On the other hand, the Tibetan Phuntsok Wangyal, who founded the Tibetan Communist Party in the 1940s, describes the old system as unequal and exploitative.

One of the earliest publications in English to apply the term "serf" to Tibet was Marxist journalist Anna Louise Strong's work from 1960, When Serfs Stood up in Tibet, published by the Chinese government. Another seminal promoter of the term is historian A. Tom Grunfeld, who based his writings on the work of British explorers of the region, in particular Sir Charles Bell. It has been argued that his book is not supported by traditional Tibetan, Chinese, or Indian histories, that it contains inaccuracies and distortions, and that Grunfeld's extracts from Bell were taken out of context to mislead readers. Grunfeld is a polarizing figure for the Chinese, who praise his work, his scholarship, and his integrity; and the Tibetans, who match this praise with condemnation, calling him a "sinologist" who lacks authority on Tibetan history due to his inability to read Tibetan and his not having been to Tibet before writing his book. Political scientist Michael Parenti's 2003 (revised in 2007) essay Friendly Feudalism: The Tibet Myth was largely based on the preceding work of Stuart and Roma Gelder (Timely Rain: Travels in New Tibet 1964), Strong and Grunfeld.

Melvyn Goldstein has produced many works on Tibetan society since the 1960s and used "serf" to translate the Tibetan term mi ser (literally "yellow person"; also translated as peasant") and to describe both the landless peasant classes and the wealthier land holding and taxpaying class of families. He has written, "with the exception of about 300 noble families, all laymen and laywomen in Tibet were serfs (Mi ser) bound via ascription by parallel descent to a particular lord (dPon-po) though an estate, in other words sons were ascribed to their father's lord but daughters to their mother's lord." In his 1989 book A History of Modern Tibet Goldstein argued that although serfdom was prevalent in Tibet, this did not mean that it was an entirely static society. There were several types of serf sub-status, of which one of the most important was the "human lease", which enabled a serf to acquire a degree of personal freedom. This was an alternative which, despite retaining the concept of lordship, partially freed the mi ser from obligations to a landed estate, usually for an annual fee. In 1997 Goldstein used the term "serf" in the following, more cautious, way "...monastic and aristocratic elites ... held most of the land in Tibet in the form of feudal estates with hereditarily bound serflike peasants." Powers has characterized Goldstein as "generally pro-China" but also called his History of Modern Tibet "the most balanced treatment". Goldstein describes himself as having conservative political views. According to William Monroe Coleman, China misrepresents Goldstein's usage as support for their version of Tibetan history.

Goldstein distinguished serfdom from feudalism, and applied the term "serfdom" but not "feudalism" to old Tibet. Furthermore, he made some effort to avoid appearing to support China's invasion of Tibet, writing that the PRC left the traditional system in place, not only after the invasion of 1950, but even after the Dalai Lama's flight into exile in 1959. He pointed out that in 1950, Chinese rhetoric claimed that China was freeing Tibet, not from serfdom, but from imperialist influence. Nevertheless, his usage has been misinterpreted as support for the Chinese Marxist viewpoint, in which feudalism and serfdom are inseparable, and old Tibet is consistently described as "feudal serfdom".

Not all writers who use the term "serfdom" to describe the pre-1950 society in Tibet do so pejoratively. Pico Iyer, a journalist whose father is a friend of the Dalai Lama and who has himself been in private conversation with him for over thirty years writes: "Almost as soon as he came into exile, in 1959, the Dalai Lama seized the chance to get rid of much of the red tape and serfdom that had beset Tibet in the past". The Dalai Lama himself used the term "serf" in 1991, saying: "The relationship between landlord and serf was much milder in Tibet than in China and conditions for the poor were much less harsh."

Several Tibetan sources portray Tibetan peasants and workers to support their own view of a Tibetan people who were not only independent of China, but found the Chinese alien and incomprehensible, and who suffered genocide under Chinese rule. Richardson, the British Trade Envoy to Tibet in the 1940s, agrees with Tibetan authors, stating there was little difference between the rich and the poor.

Journalist Thomas Laird notes that scholars debate the applicability of these terms to Tibet, and struggle with a lack of sufficient data. Journalist Barbara Crossette asserted in 1998 that "scholars of Tibet mostly agree that there has been no systematic serfdom in Tibet in centuries."

The Tibetan Government-in-Exile says about conditions in Tibet pre-Communism:
Traditional Tibetan society was, by no means, perfect and was in need of changes. The Dalai Lama and other Tibetan leaders have admitted as much. That is the reason why the Dalai Lama initiated far-reaching reforms in Tibet as soon as he assumed temporal authority. The traditional Tibetan society, however, was not nearly as bad as China would have us believe.

The academic debate
The academic debate as to whether "serf" is an applicable term for a society such as pre-1950 Tibet continues to this day. Goldstein and Miller's exchanges in an academic journal between 1986 and 1989 were a notable part of this debate. The applicability of the concept of serfdom to Tibet was debated between Melvyn Goldstein and anthropologist Beatrice D. Miller of Wisconsin University over a series of five articles in the Tibet Journal. The debate was initiated by Goldstein in the XI edition of the Tibet Journal, in which he defended his description of the features of Tibetan society as being very comparable to European serfdom. He based the comparison on the features of serfdom described by French historian Marc Bloch including:

 The status was hereditary.
 A serf, unlike a slave, had rights and possessed but did not own productive resources (land).
 The lord had the legal right to command his serfs, including judicial authority over him or her.

Goldstein argued that Tibetan society fulfilled all these requirements, and argued in detail against the specific diverging opinions of fellow scholars Miller, Micheal, Dargyay and Aziz. He underpinned his assertions by research, first hand accounts and case studies, and responded to criticisms which had been voiced by these researchers in the preceding years.

Only Miller responded in the next The Tibet Journal, in a short letter, in 1987. She acknowledged Goldstein's scholarship, stating "Goldstein's article ... cannot be faulted. It is an outstanding example of his exemplary collection of fine data." She disagreed however with his interpretation, specifically the use of the word "serf" and challenged him by asserting the following:

 That a lord also had obligations to the central government, so the specific obligations of a peasant (Tibetan: "mi ser") to a lord were only examples of societal obligations which everyone had.
 That the obligations owed to a lord were by the family collective, and not "personal" or individual.
 That the obligations of a peasant were not so onerous as it was easy to run away.

In the following issue Goldstein replied in brief arguing:

 The nature of the lord's relation with the central government was radically different from the peasant/lord relation and not relevant to the peasant/lord relation he was discussing.
 While corvee obligations fell primarily on households, a peasant's legal status very much related to his person was hereditary and not rescindable.
 He pointed out that running away was illegal, punishable, and that European serfs also ran away.
 He strongly disagreed with Miller's assertion that the peasant/lord relation was fundamentally contractual.

In a later publication and response Goldstein agreed to differ on the use of the word "serf" to prevent a terminological discussion distracting from the examination of societal conditions. He argued that running away was an act of desperation severing familial, social and economic ties. He discussed the form of partial manumission known as "human lease" and argued that: it only temporarily freed from daily service but not occasional service at the lord's discretion; the payment of an annual fee decided by the lord was required; it was revocable at will by the lord. Thus he felt it was a very weak form of manumission.

Coleman, integrating Goldstein's research with subsequent work done by other scholars including Rebecca French, Graham Clarke, and Franz Michael, argues that Goldstein overemphasized the de jure status of the mi ser at the expense of de facto characteristics – a high degree of social and economic mobility, and hence autonomy; frequently successful negotiations with lords to improve their status; and flight from untenable situations such as unpayable debts and exorbitant labor requirements. He concludes that "serf" is a misleading term for the Tibetan mi ser.

Human rights in Tibet

In the political debate regarding the nature of pre-1950 Tibet, Chinese sources assert human rights abuses as a justification for the Communist invasion. Both before and after the Communist takeover of 1950 there have been examples of human rights abuses, both state-sanctioned and otherwise. The political debate associated with the Serfdom in Tibet controversy rests on whether these incidents justify the positions of the opposing parties. Sympathisers of the Chinese government's position view the pre-1950s abuses as justifying the Communist regime in the Tibetan Autonomous Region. Supporters of the Tibetan Government in Exile argue that the 13th Dalai Lama had already effected reforms which were ahead of the world at the time, and that further reforms were underway, and no outside intervention was justified.

Prior to 1950
Judicial mutilation – principally the gouging out of eyes, and the cutting off of hands or feet – was formalized under the Sakya school as part of the 13th century Tibetan legal code, and was used as a legal punishment until being declared illegal in 1913 by a proclamation of the 13th Dalai Lama. In this same reform, the Dalai Lama banned capital punishment, making Tibet one of the first countries to do so (preceding, for instance, Switzerland, Britain, and France). The 14th Dalai Lama's brother Jigme Norbu reports that, along with these reforms, living conditions in jails were improved, with officials being designated to see that these conditions and rules were maintained."

Incidents of mutilation have been recorded in Tibet in the period between the start of the 20th century and the Chinese occupation. Tibetan communist Phuntso Wangye recalled his anger at seeing freshly severed human ears hanging from the gate of the county headquarters in Damshung north of Lhasa in 1945.

Robert W. Ford, one of the few Westerners to have been appointed by the Government of Tibet at the time of de facto independent Tibet, spent five years in Tibet, from 1945 to 1950, before his arrest by the invading Chinese army. In his book Wind Between the Worlds: Captured in Tibet, he writes

Former Nazi Party member Heinrich Harrer, who lived in Tibet at the same time (1944 to 1951), wrote in his book "Return to Tibet" that these treatments had already ceased at that time:

Because Tibetan Buddhism prohibits killing, mutilation and other extremely cruel punishments were widely used instead in old Tibet. The mutilation of top level Tibetan official Lungshar in 1934 gave an example. Tsepon Lungshar, an official educated in England, introduced reform in the 1920s; after losing a political struggle the reformist was sentenced to be blinded by having his eyeballs pulled out. "The method involved the placement of a smooth, round yak's knucklebone on each of the temples of the prisoner. These were then tied by leather thongs around the head and tightened by turning the thongs with a stick on top of the head until the eyeballs popped out. The mutilation was terribly bungled. Only one eyeball popped out, and eventually the ragyaba had to cut out the other eyeball with a knife. Boiling oil was then poured into the sockets to cauterize the wound." This was sufficiently unusual that the untouchables (ragyapba) carrying it out had no previous experience of the correct technique and had to rely on instructions heard from their parents. An attempt was made at anesthetizing the alleged criminal with intoxicants before performing the punishment, which unfortunately did not work well.

As late as 1949 the Tibetan government still sentenced people to mutilation. When a CIA officer Douglas Mackiernan was killed against official entry permit, six Tibetan border guards were tried and sentenced in Lhasa. "The leader was to have his nose and both ears cut off. The man who fired the first shot was to lose both ears. A third man was to lose one ear, and the others were to get 50 lashes each." The sentence was reduced to 200, 50 and 25 lashes, respectively, after another CIA agent Frank Bessac requested leniency.

Whipping was legal and common as punishment in Tibet including in the 20th century, also for minor infractions and outside judicial processes. Whipping could also have fatal consequences, as in the case of the trader Gyebo Sherpa subjected to the severe corca whipping for selling cigarettes. He died from his wounds 2 days later in the Potala prison. The Tibetan tibetologist Tashi Tsering records being whipped as a 13-year-old for missing a performance as a dancer in the Dalai Lama's dance troop in 1942, until the skin split and the pain became excruciating.

The People's Republic of China states that human rights were 'severely infringed upon' by the Dalai Lama's administration. The evidence for these accusations is disputed.

According to writer Rebecca French, Tibetans viewed criminal offenses as uncommon, but there are few records to establish frequency. However, Tibetans also believe that theft and banditry were common especially along trade routes. Because it was considered harsh by most Tibetans, they tended to seek alternative settlements and leniency from local courts instead of pursuing government action in disputes. Local officials were also more likely to find peaceful outcomes in a community setting than to resort to harsher government resolution.

Political power could play a role in a judicial process in Tibet. In the eye gouging case above the alleged criminal was a deposed member of the Kashag called Lungshar who had proposed democratic reform. The charge was planning a coup and the attempted murder of another Kashag member who opposed reform. It was strenuously denied by the accused. Conviction was based on the evidence of one informer who claimed to have seen a document which was never produced. He was richly rewarded, and the trial seems to have been a show trial by traditionalists seeking to prevent reform. From arrest to execution of the sentence was only ten days, limiting the possibilities of appeal.

One evidence of Chinese brutality in Eastern Tibet was reported by an American missionary in the following terms:
There is no method of torture known that is not practiced in here on these Tibetans, slicing, boiling, tearing asunder and all …To sum up what China is doing here in eastern Tibet, the main things are collecting taxes, robbing, oppressing, confiscating, and allowing her representatives to burn and loot and steal.
Believing that the American missionary's account might be a mistake, Sir Eric Teichman, a British diplomat, noted that whatever brutality existed, it was "in no way due to any action of the Chinese government in Peking or the provincial authorities in Szechuana."

Slavery
Israel Epstein wrote that prior to the Communist takeover, poverty in Tibet was so severe that in some of the worst cases peasants had to hand over children to the manor as household slaves or nangzan, because they were too poor to raise them. On the other hand, Laird asserted that in the 1940s Tibetan peasants were well off and immune to famine, whereas starvation was common in China. According to other sources, the so-called "slaves" were domestic servants (nangtsen) and managers of estates in reality.

In 1904, a British expeditionary force occupied the Chumbi Valley for four years, in the border region adjacent to Bhutan and India. Sir Charles Bell was put in charge of the district from September 1904 to November 1905 and wrote that slavery was still practiced in Chumbi but had declined greatly over the previous thirty years. He noted that only a dozen or two dozen slaves remained, unlike nearby Bhutan where slavery was more widespread. Bell further remarked, "The slavery in the Chumpi valley was of a very mild type. If a slave was not well treated, it was easy for him to escape into Sikkim and British India."

Tibetan welfare after the Chinese takeover
Just as the Chinese and the Tibetan exile community argue over whether common Tibetans suffered or flourished before the Chinese takeover, they take diametrically opposing views on the fate of ordinary Tibetans since 1950. This is understood to be highly important in persuading readers of the legitimacy or illegitimacy of Chinese rule. Chinese sources in English claim rapid progress for prosperous, free, and happy Tibetans participating in democratic reforms. Exiled Tibetans, on the other hand, write of Chinese genocide in Tibet, comparing the Chinese to the Nazis. After the Cultural Revolution, according to Powers, scholar Warren Smith, whose work became focused on Tibetan history and politics after spending five months in Tibet in 1982, portrays the Chinese as chauvinists who believe they are superior to the Tibetans, and claims that the Chinese use torture, coercion and starvation to control the Tibetans.

The Tibet Autonomous Region is much poorer than other provinces of China. In 1980, in order to help Tibet out of poverty, the 1st Tibet Work Forum (moderated by Hu Yaobang, the General Secretary of the Chinese Communist Party), decided to give the Tibet Autonomous Region financial support, in order to build a "united, prosperous, civilized new Tibet". After this Forum, in the Tibet Autonomous Region, all taxes on agriculture and animal husbandry were waived, while other provinces had to wait until 2006 for the same. The old “people's commune” economic system was dismantled (while in other provinces it was ended in 1985), so farmland started to be used by the household, and livestock started to be owned and used by the household. In the People's Republic of China, the Tibet Autonomous Region is the only provincial level administrative region that enjoys some tax incentives, and after 1988 is the only provincial level administrative region that receives growing substantial quota subsidies from the central government. Under the "partner assistance" policy, all the rich provinces and municipalities directly under the Central Government, most of the Central Government organs, and some central enterprises respectively assist the prefectures and cities of the Tibet Autonomous Region. With this assistance, in 1988, the Tibet Autonomous Region eliminated its fiscal deficit for the first time in history. As the only provincial level "poverty-stricken areas which lie in vast, contiguous stretches" in the People's Republic of China, the Tibet Autonomous Region developed a lot of anti-poverty programs, and the impoverished population has been shrinking substantially. However, there are still many difficulties in poverty reduction.Until the end of 2012, the social security system in the Tibet Autonomous Region has been completely established. This system not only includes ordinary people, but also all the 29,000 monks and nuns of Tibetan Buddhism in the Tibet Autonomous Region.

There is also evidence of human rights infringements, including the 2006 Nangpa La shootings. See human rights in the People's Republic of China and Human rights in Tibet (include all the Tibetan areas) for an overview. The Human Rights Watch World Report 2008: Events in China 2007 states:
Widespread and numerous instances of repression target ordinary citizens, monks, nuns, and even children in an effort to quash alleged "separatism." Seven Tibetan boys in Gansu province were detained for over a month in early September after they allegedly wrote slogans on the walls of a village police station and elsewhere calling for the return of the Dalai Lama and a free Tibet. Ronggyal Adrak was detained and charged under state security offenses by police on August 1 after he called for the Dalai Lama's return at a horse race festival in Sichuan province. He is awaiting trial. The Chinese government has failed to bring to justice those responsible for the shooting death by People's Armed Police officers of a 17-year-old nun, Kelsang Namtso, while trying to cross the border into Nepal on September 30, 2006. 

It is notable in this report that most of the examples are not in the Tibet Autonomous Region, but in other provinces of China, such as Gansu Province and Sichuan Province (Tibetan areas in Sichuan are the eastern part of Kham). These areas (i.e. the Tibetan areas in Sichuan Province, Gansu Province, Yunnan Province and Qinghai Province) were not included in political Tibet, so they were not involved in the Serfs' Emancipation, which was in the Tibet Autonomous Region. During the "reform and opening up" after 1978, when the central government of the PRC gave numerous support policies and substantial financial support to the Tibet Autonomous Region, the Tibetan areas in the four provinces did not get the same. Although some of them (such as the Dêqên Tibetan Autonomous Prefecture in Yunnan) are rich enough, others of them are not rich, and some of them in Sichuan, Gansu and Qinghai are poor enough. The Tibetan areas in the four provinces ask the central government to benefit them as the Tibet Autonomous Region. And the poverty in these areas makes some of their Tibetan residents support the idea of "Greater Tibet" which is claimed by Tibetan exile groups.

In 2010, on the 5th Tibet Work Forum, the central government declared its intention to make the Tibetan areas in the four provinces steadily progress as well as the Tibet Autonomous Region. The goal is to bring the Tibet Autonomous Region and the Tibetan areas in the four provinces in line together with the goal of building a moderately prosperous society in an all-around way in 2020.

Comparison to other regions

Debate continues as to whether pre-1950 Tibetan society was especially oppressive or was comparable to, or better than, similar social structures in nearby regions. According to the Tibetan Government-in-Exile: "In terms of social mobility and wealth distribution, independent Tibet compared favourably with most Asian countries" the fact that most Dalai Lamas, including Thubten Gyatso, 13th Dalai Lama and Tenzin Gyatso, 14th Dalai Lama, came from peasant families being cited as an example of this. Travelers who witnessed conditions in both China and Tibet in the 1940s found the Tibetan peasants to be far better off than their Chinese counterparts. Academics debate whether tribal cultures, such as the Mongolian nomadic steppe culture, are feudal in nature. Much of Mongolian, Tibetan and Chinese political history is inter-related but the extent of their shared social structures is uncertain.

According to the United Nations Research Institute for Social Development, bonded labor and other forms of economic exploitation currently exist in nearby regions including India, Nepal, and several Chinese provinces. Kamaiya, the bonded labour system in neighbouring Nepal, was formally abolished in the year 2000. In 2007 Shanxi, China was the scene of its own slave scandal that turned out to involve human trafficking and slave labor in Hebei, Guangdong and Xinjiang provinces as well. According to the U.S. Dept of State "Trafficking in Persons Report 2008," Bangladesh, Nepal, Mongolia and Pakistan are all Tier 2 countries, with China and India both on the Tier 2 watchlist. However no local regions are in Tier 3.

See also
2007 Chinese slave scandal
Battle of Chamdo 
Serfs Emancipation Day
Tibetan sovereignty debate
Tibetan Uprising Day

Notes

References

Barnett, Robert, [http://info-buddhism.com/Human-Rights-in-Tibet-before-1959_Robert_Barnett.html 19: What were the conditions regarding human rights in Tibet before democratic reform? (Questions 12, 13, and 92, 2001)] in: Blondeau, Anne-Marie and Buffetrille, Katia (eds). Authenticating Tibet: Answers to China's 100 Questions (2008) University of California Press.  (cloth);  (paper).
Bell, Charles. Tibet Past and Present

Crossette, Barbara (1998) The World: Searching for Tibet; The Shangri-La That Never Was in The New York Times 5 July 1998
Dalai Lama, Freedom in Exile (NY: HarperPerennial edition, 1991)
Epstein, Israel. Tibet Transformed (1983) New World Press. 

French, Rebecca Redwood The Golden Yoke: The Legal Cosmology of Buddhist Tibet (1995) Cornell University Press. 

Goldstein, Melvyn. Central Asiatic Journal (1971). Taxation and the Structure of a Tibetan village.
Goldstein, Melvyn C. Reexamining Choice, Dependency and Command in the Tibetan Social System: "Tax Appendages" and Other Landless Serfs. The Tibet Journal 11, no. 4 (1986) pp. 79–112. Available online at 
Goldstein, Melvyn C. A History of Modern Tibet, 1913–1951: The Demise of the Lamaist State (1989) University of California Press. 
Goldstein, Melvyn C. The Snow Lion and the Dragon: China, Tibet, and the Dalai Lama (1997) University of California Press. 
Goldstein, Melvyn C., Tsering, Tashi, and Siebenschuh, William. The Struggle for Modern Tibet: The Autobiography of Tashi Tsering (1997) East Gate. 
Goldstein, Melvyn C., Sherap, Dawei, and Siebenschuh, William. A Tibetan Revolutionary: The Political Life and Times of Bapa Phüntso Wangye (2004) UC Press. 
Iyer, Pico. The Open Road: The Global Journey of the Fourteenth Dalai Lama (2008) Bloomsbury. 
Laird, Thomas. The Story of Tibet: Conversations with the Dalai Lama (2006) Grove Press. 
Norbu, Thubten Jigme and Turnbull, Colin M. Tibet: An account of the history, the religion and the people of Tibet (1968) Touchstone Books. New York. 
Petech, Luciano. China and Tibet in Early Eighteenth Century: History of the Establishment of the Chinese Protectorate in Tibet (1973) Hyperion Press. 
Pinfold, John. Tibet World Bibliographical Series (1991) 
Powers, John. History as Propaganda: Tibetan Exiles versus the People's Republic of China (2004) Oxford University Press. 
Smith, Warren W., Jr. Tibetan Nation: A History Of Tibetan Nationalism And Sino-Tibetan Relations (1997) Westview press.

External links
The Goldstein and Miller Debate on "Reexamining Choice, Dependency and Command In The Tibetan Social System: 'Tax Appendages' and Other Landless Serfs"

Annexation of Tibet by the People's Republic of China
Buddhism-related controversies
Controversies in Tibet
Feudalism in Asia
Political science
Politics of Tibet
Serfdom
Tibetan independence movement